St. Albert was a territorial electoral district that existed twice in the Northwest Territories, Canada. The first district existed from 1885 until 1888. The district was recreated in 1891 and was abolished in 1905.

History

The electoral district was created by Royal Proclamation in 1885. The electoral district was named after the settlement of St. Albert situated just northwest of Edmonton. The first incarnation of the district was abolished in 1888 after it was merged to become part of the Edmonton electoral district under the North-West  Representation Act 1888. Edmonton would be broken up again after dissolution of the 1st North-West Legislative Assembly in 1891 and the district recreated. The electoral district was abolished in 1905 when Alberta and Saskatchewan were created.

References

External links 
Website of the Legislative Assembly of Northwest Territories

Former electoral districts of Northwest Territories
Politics of St. Albert, Alberta